Saidal Group is an Algerian pharmaceutical company created in 1982. Saidal Group is the largest pharmaceutical company in Algeria and one of the largest in Africa.

Saidal Group exports its products to Ivory Coast, Gabon, Senegal, Cameroon, Mali, Democratic Republic of the Congo, Republic of the Congo, Niger, Togo, Benin, Guinea-Bissau, Chad and Mauritania.

History 

Saidal was created in April 1982 following the restructuring of the Algerian Central Pharmacy. In 1985, it changed its name to become Saidal.

In 1989, Saidal became an economic public company, one of the first national company to acquire the status of joint stock company in 1993. In 1997, Saidal was transformed into an industrial group, which Biotic, Pharmal and Antibiotical were attached.

In March 2022, the group announced the launch of its first bioequivalence center called “Equival”.

Company management 
Saïdal is headed by :
 Hamdane rabah (1982-1990)
 Boumediene Derkaoui (2010-2015)
 Mohamed Hammouche (2015-2016)
 Yacine Tounsi (2016-2017)
 Mohamed Nouas (2017-2020)
 Fatouma Akacem since February 11, 2020

References

External links

Pharmaceutical companies of Algeria
Generic drug manufacturers
1982 establishments in Algeria
Pharmaceutical companies established in 1982
Companies based in Algiers
Algerian brands